Zaļā Manor is a manor house in the historical region of Courland, in Vilgāle, Kurmāle Parish, Kuldīga Municipality, Latvia. 
It serves as the student boarding residence for the Vilgāle primary school.

See also
List of palaces and manor houses in Latvia

References

Manor houses in Latvia
Kuldīga Municipality